Nephrurus levis, commonly known as the three-lined knob-tailed gecko, smooth knob-tailed gecko, or common knob-tailed gecko, is a native Australian gecko species. The smooth knob-tailed gecko is part of the Carphodactylidae family, a family endemic to Australia.  A common, alternative, name for this family is barking geckos due loud barks they make during threat displays, which includes swaying their bodies, winding their tail and attacking with an open mouth. There are multiple sub-species of Nephrurus levis, these include N.l. levis, N.l. occidentalis and N.l. pibarenis. Its aboriginal name is Illchiljera.

Description
A robust, medium-sized gecko, with a large, triangular head. It has a short, flattened, carrot shaped like tail, that ends in a knob. This tail can be autotomised to distract predators, however unlike other lizards they have only one cleavage point at the base, meaning it must sacrifice its whole tail in the event. It has long slender limbs with non-retractile claws on digits, of which the outer most one is opposable. The gecko has vertically slit ears at the widest part of its head and very large eyes that have vertical pupils. On the dorsal side, it is generally a pinkish-grey to purplish-brown colour, with a unique pattern of darker and lighter spots, bars or lines.  The underbelly is white. N. levis is speckled in pale and dark tubercles on the body and tail which often form bands. Levis means smooth, referring to the skins smoothness compared to the genotype of N. asper (asper meaning rough).

Males are usually smaller than the females, with both being able to live up to 15 years in captivity.

Distribution and habitat

Distribution 
Smooth knob-tailed geckos are distributed throughout the arid interior of Australia, occurring in all mainland states and territories other than Victoria and the ACT. They are prevalent throughout the state of South Australia, including as far south as Adelaide. They can be commonly found as far north as Tennant Creek, Northern Territory; as far east as Bourke, New South Wales and as far west as Western Australia's coastline.

Habitat 
The smooth knob-tailed gecko is found in a wide range of habitats, including arid, semiarid, open woodland, arid scrubs, spinifex covered deserts, sand-plains and dune-fields.

Behaviours

Habits
N. levis is a nocturnal, terrestrial species, resting during the heat of the day in self-constructed, fully secure earthen hideaways. In addition to digging their own holes to shelter in, these geckos aren’t averse to utilising  another animal’s burrow, if available. The knob-tail stalks prey at night (most actively after rain), in open areas, and between shrubs or spinifex. N. levis can survive lower temperatures for longer periods, when  compared to other geckos of the region; this adaptation gives the species a distinct advantage when hunting at night, as it is less affected by cooler temperatures. Ultimately, the gecko will be more nimble and quick than its 'cold', lethargic and vulnerable insect prey. While not the slowest-moving of all reptile species (and certainly not the most placid), these geckos are still not the fastest, either; being able to successfully catch insects is certainly  a survival necessity. However, during very cold spells, smooth knob-tailed geckos will burrow and suspend their appetites slightly, remaining sheltered for longer periods.

Diet
The smooth knob-tailed Gecko is considered to be an insectivore, preying on spiders, grasshoppers, beetles, cockroaches, scorpions, centipedes and even on other smaller geckos.

Reproduction
The breeding season occurs between October and March (warmer months), with females able to have 6 or 7 clutches of eggs. When females are ready to breed they will show receptive behaviours, allowing the males to mate with them. Non-receptive females will stand their ground, either attacking or running from the male. After mating, deposition takes around 4 to 6 weeks (however can take up to 9 weeks), then the eggs take around 6 to 8 weeks to hatch. Each clutch predominantly has 2 eggs (rarely one).

Conservation
N. levis are listed as ‘Least Concern’ by the IUCN's Species Red List due to its large range of distribution and lack of any major threats, at the current time. Localized threats for this species are grazing of livestock and land clearing, however unless there is large-scale decline in their abundance there is no need for a higher threat category.

References

Nephrurus
Reptiles described in 1886
Endemic fauna of Australia
Geckos of Australia
Taxa named by Charles Walter De Vis